Gerolf Emma Jozef Annemans (born 8 November 1958) is a Belgian lawyer, journalist and politician of the Flemish nationalist party Vlaams Belang (VB) and formerly of its predecessor, the Vlaams Blok. He has been a member of the European Parliament since 2014, and a city councilor in Antwerp since 2000. He served as a member of the Chamber of Representatives from 1987 to 2014, and as a city councilor in Brasschaat from 1994 to 2000. He was the former leader of the VB from 2012 to 2014, and led the Vlaams Blok and VB parliamentary groups from 1991 to 2013.

Political career

Youth and initial career 
Annemans read law at the University of Antwerp (UA) and graduated in 1982. He held a seat on the council of the university's law faculty and the UA governing and executive boards. He was also the chief editor of the UA-newspaper and presidium member of Sofia, the guild of the Antwerp law students. During his academic studies from 1980–1981, Annemans was head of the editorial staff of the students' magazine Tegenstroom, the club publication of the Katholiek Vlaams Hoogstudentenverbond (Flemish Catholic Students' Society, KVHV) society. After graduating he also contributed to several columns in the pro-Flemish conservative weekly newspaper 't Pallieterke. Annemans was briefly promoted to a chief editing position at 't Pallieterke but eventually opted for a career in politics.

Vlaams Blok / Vlaams Belang 
In 1985, Gerolf Annemans became a public activist of the Vlaams Blok (renamed Vlaams Belang on 14 November 2004), as he was offered the place of first substitute on the electoral list for the Belgian federal parliament in the constituency of Antwerp. From 1987 onwards, he had a seat in that assembly, and thus is the longest established Vlaams Belang MP. Until 2013, he chaired the Vlaams Belang group. On his watch the party grew from a two-headed group to Belgium's third largest political faction, counting 18 members (after the 2003 Belgian federal election). Furthermore, Annemans is a longstanding member of the city council of Antwerp, a prominent on the Vlaams Belang party board and former director of the Vlaams Belang political research department.

A quarter-century of parliamentary opposition 
In his parliamentary work and speeches, he often mentions what he calls "the Belgian disease" (the inability of Flemings and Walloons yet to rule together efficiently). The cordon sanitaire (the unwritten agreement among all other parties not to work together with Vlaams Belang, irrespective of the number of its elected representatives) is viewed by Annemans as a problem that concerns Flanders in its entirety, because it has been imposed on Flemish politics by an alliance of Francophone parties and their Flemish left-wing collaborators. Still, he believes this instrument of threat and coercion will never bring Vlaams Belang to its knees. Annemans has always disputed the argument that a vote for Vlaams Belang, therefore, is pointless. The role he reserves for his party is that of a consistent, influential opposition party, able to adjust administration when necessary. In this way, the party may also function as an alternative to the moderate Flemish-regionalist N-VA, which, in his view, got entirely absorbed by Belgian power politics. Recently, Annemans did not only present himself as a member of the Flemish Movement, but also as a true republican. In doing so, he advocates thorough social reform through Flemish independence, as well as through a far-reaching transformation of the EU on the basis of the sovereignty principle.

Member of investigative and persecutive commissions 
In his crusade against what he diagnoses as the "Belgian disease" (in this sense the political-administrative tangle facilitating inefficiency and corruption), he joined several parliamentary commissions for the investigation of scandals and embezzlements. In that capacity, Annemans took part in the Dutroux commission (1996), the commission investigating the "Brabant massacres" (also 1996), the Dioxin affair commission (1999), the Sabena commission (2001), and the two commissions concerning the Fortis affair (2009).

Annemans and Lijst Dedecker 
After the federal elections of 10 June 2007, Annemans warned his partisans on his weblog for underestimation of the "Dedecker factor". He did not believe that the then successful Lijst Dedecker (a one man-party founded and presided by Jean-Marie Dedecker) would be a temporary hype such as the former party ROSSEM had been. According to Annemans, Dedecker had "broken the traditional monopoly of VB as the Robin Hood, the big mouth and Lucky Luke which all others fear." Moreover, the Belgian king Albert II received Jean-Marie Dedecker for his consultations following the elections, and not the then VB party chairman Frank Vanhecke. In a political talk show Annemans called it an error to exclude cooperation with Lijst Dedecker.

The orderly split-up of Belgium 
In 2010, Annemans announced the publication of a new book in which he would outline a blueprint for the "active preparation of Flemish independence." The main point of this book, that was co-authored by Steven Utsi and released in October 2010, is that the Flemings mustn't cling to concrete road maps for independence, but rather pursue an open strategy. With international law at its side, Flanders already possesses some convincing trumps for dismantling Belgium on its own initiative. For the Flemings, everything will depend on properly reacting against each Francophone move, as well as choosing the right moment for exiting the Belgian federation. The book was edited five times, an English translation titled "After Belgium, the orderly split-up" included, and was sold over 6,000 times, a true bestseller to Flemish standards. The fourth print got outlawed in 2012 by the commercial court of Brussels. The judge ruled that the publication would have violated the rights of the British telecommunications provider O2, because the chemical symbol for oxygen (also the company's logo) figures on its cover. Furthermore, the book inspired Annemans to conceive two manifestoes that gave more depth to the Vlaams Belang platform: the Hoofdstad-Manifest on Brussels (spring 2013), and the Europa-Manifest on the EU (autumn 2013).

Party ideologist 

With the abovementioned book and manifestoes, Annemans confirms his status of ideological trailblazer. He sees Vlaams Belang as a hotbed of new political viewpoints, even as a social avant-garde. This innovative ambitions also resound in his most recent publication "1914–2014: Van loopgraven tot republiek" (1914–2014: From trench to republic). According to Annemans, the book should not be considered as a political testament, but rather as a 'helicopter perspective' of Flanders' past and the challenges the Vlaams Belang ought to deal with in the twenty-first century. As director of the Vlaams Belang political research department, and afterwards as party chairman, he carried the final responsibility for several election programmes as well as the texts and brochures for ideological congresses and colloquiums. In total, Annemans wrote ten books on republican, ethical and security matters.

Many times he had been alleged to be co-author of the widely despised 70-point plan (Belgium) to stop immigration, though this isn't correct. On the other hand, Annemans has a clear-cut vision on immigration and always insisted on the importance of an elaborate migration chapter in the VB platform. However, his adversaries have created the wrong impression that the Vlaams Blok/Belang repeatedly attempted to launch policy plans based on the 70-point plan. In fact, the plan has been eliminated by the party board many years back.

Party chairman 
On 16 December 2012, Annemans was elected chairman of the Vlaams Belang. He succeeded Bruno Valkeniers after an unsatisfactory electoral result. The party had lost over two-thirds of its electorate in its traditional stronghold Antwerp. Annemans' chairmanship was confirmed in a secret ballot by a large majority of 92% of party members. The fresh VB foreman championed a strict migration policy and a revision of EU cooperation, but, above all, voiced more than ever the demand for an independent Flanders.

On 25 May 2014, he was the leading candidate of Vlaams Belang for the European Parliament and was elected as the sole MEP of his party. That day the party suffered a serious defeat, not only at the EU elections, but also in the regional and federal elections. Already on the day after, Annemans announced his retreat and an early chairmanship election in October 2014.

Private life 
Gerolf Annemans is married and has three children.

References

External links 
 Official website

1958 births
Living people
Belgian Roman Catholics
Members of the Chamber of Representatives (Belgium)
MEPs for Belgium 2014–2019
MEPs for Belgium 2019–2024
Politicians from Antwerp
University of Antwerp alumni
Vlaams Belang MEPs
Vlaams Belang politicians